Rukhsat is a 1988 Indian Hindi-language romanctic deana film directed by Simi Garewal, starring Mithun Chakraborty, Anuradha Patel, Marc Zuber, Pradeep Kumar, Rohini Hattangadi and Amrish Puri. The plot of the movie is taken from Ken Follett's novel The Man from St. Petersburg.

Cast

 Mithun Chakraborty
 Anuradha Patel
 Marc Zuber
 Simi Garewal
 Amrish Puri
 Pradeep Kumar
 Rohini Hattangadi
 Tom Alter

Soundtrack

References

External links
 
http://ibosnetwork.com/asp/filmbodetails.asp?id=Commando
http://www.bollywoodhungama.com/movies/cast/5203/index.html
http://www.simigarewal.com/rukhsat.html

1988 films
1980s Hindi-language films
Films scored by Kalyanji Anandji
Indian romantic drama films
Indian crime drama films
Films based on American novels